Stadium Lokomotiv is a multi-purpose stadium in Rousse, Bulgaria.  It is currently used mostly for football matches and is the home ground of FC Lokomotiv Ruse.  The stadium holds 12,000 people.

Football venues in Bulgaria
Buildings and structures in Ruse, Bulgaria
Multi-purpose stadiums in Bulgaria
Ruse, Bulgaria